Marcus Markley Thames (born March 6, 1977) is an American former baseball left fielder, designated hitter, and current coach. He played for the New York Yankees, Texas Rangers, Detroit Tigers and Los Angeles Dodgers of Major League Baseball (MLB) from 2002 through 2011, and coached the Yankees from 2016 through 2021.

For his career, Thames averaged a home run every 15.9 at-bats and holds the Tigers franchise record for average at-bats per home run, at 14.8.

Collegiate career
He attended East Central Community College in Decatur, Mississippi.

Professional career

First stint with the Yankees
Thames was drafted by the New York Yankees in the 30th round of the 1996 Major League Baseball Draft.

Thames warranted "prospect" status from the Yankees following a standout 2001 season for the AA affiliate Norwich Navigators, in which he batted .321 with 31 home runs and 97 runs batted in. For his efforts, he was named to the Baseball America minor league all-star team.

On June 10, 2002, Thames began his major league career with a bang as he was the 80th player in history to hit a home run in his first at bat. Thames hit the home run off the first pitch he saw from Randy Johnson of the Arizona Diamondbacks. As his coaches and teammates were laughing in amazement, Thames stepped out of the dugout for a curtain call to a capacity crowd at Yankee Stadium.

Texas Rangers
On June 6, 2003, the Yankees, who were looking for a left-handed batter, traded Thames to the Texas Rangers for Rubén Sierra.  Thames hit a home run in his first at bat with the Rangers.

Detroit Tigers

Thames was granted free-agency on October 15 and signed with the Detroit Tigers on December 7.

The next two seasons saw Thames splitting time between the Tigers and their AAA affiliate Toledo Mud Hens. While dominating the AAA level, he found it difficult to crack the outfield rotation in place with the parent club. However, in 2006 Thames made his first opening day roster with the blessing of new manager Jim Leyland. Playing sparsely early in the season, he soon seized his opportunity for extended playing time due to injuries to Dmitri Young and Craig Monroe. Although he suffered through a slump near the end of the season, Thames was a key component to the Tigers vast improvement in the 2006 season. He set career highs in every offensive category, hitting .256 with 26 home runs and 60 RBIs in only 348 at-bats, finishing with a solid .882 OPS. He was nicknamed "Country Strong" by Tigers broadcaster Rod Allen.

Thames spent a considerable amount of time during 2007 spring training learning the first base position, as Leyland sought ways to get Thames at-bats.

On July 1, 2007, Thames hit a solo home run in the bottom of the eighth inning to score the only run in the game in a victory over the Minnesota Twins. On July 6, he hit the third grand slam of his career at Comerica Park against the Boston Red Sox.  On July 8, Thames hit one of the longest home runs in the history of Comerica Park. Batting against pitcher Daisuke Matsuzaka of the Red Sox, Thames hit a home run to deep center field that bounced off the camera area. The last Tiger to hit a home run to that area was Eric Munson in 2004.

Thames hit eight home runs in a seven-game stretch from June 11 to 17, 2008, becoming the first Tiger in team history to achieve that feat. During that streak, eight consecutive hits were home runs.

On August 9, 2009,  Thames hit his 100th career home run. He was released from the Tigers at the end of the season.

Second stint with the Yankees
Thames signed a minor league deal to return to the Yankees on February 8, 2010.  His contract was purchased prior to the regular season, adding him to the Yankees' opening day roster.

Thames began the season platooning in left field with Brett Gardner, but was soon moved to a bench role because of his poor defense and Gardner's ability to hit left-handed pitchers. Thames would see more regular starts in left when Curtis Granderson was placed on the 15-day disabled list, as well as a few starts in right field when Nick Swisher was sidelined with an injury. However, in the latter part of the season, he rarely played the outfield, especially after the acquisition of Austin Kearns.

He hit .288 with 12 home runs in 82 games.  Although he usually only started against left-handed pitchers, Thames came through with several big hits in 2010.  On May 17, he hit a walk-off home run against Red Sox closer Jonathan Papelbon.  On July 4, Thames returned from a DL stint to hit a game-ending single against the Toronto Blue Jays.  On August 11, he helped the Yankees come back from a five-run deficit by hitting a home run in the eighth inning and a go-ahead single in the ninth inning to beat the Rangers. In a six-game stretch from August 24 to 30, he had 6 home runs and 11 RBIs in 21 at-bats.

On July 29, 2010, Thames made his first career appearance at third base (minor leagues included) as a late-inning replacement.  He committed a throwing error in his only chance. During the 2010 ALCS, Thames served as the designated hitter when Lance Berkman took over first base and Mark Teixeira went on the disabled list with a hamstring injury. The Yankees lost the ALCS to the Texas Rangers in 6 games.

Thames elected free agency from the Yankees on November 7, 2010.

Los Angeles Dodgers

Thames signed a one-year deal with the Los Angeles Dodgers for the 2011 season. He made 70 appearances for the Dodgers before being designated for assignment on July 12. He had a .197 batting average for Los Angeles. He was released a few days later.

Third stint with the Yankees
On July 22, 2011, the New York Yankees signed Thames to a minor league deal. However, he never played in a game for the Yankees at any level of their system the rest of the season.

Coaching career

Minor leagues
On January 10, 2013, Thames was named the hitting coach of the Class A-Advanced Tampa Yankees.

For the 2014 season Marcus Thames was named the hitting coach of the New York Yankees Double-A affiliate the Trenton Thunder. Top Yankees prospect Rob Refsnyder credited Thames with helping him rework his swing that allowed him to have his breakout 2014 season.

Thames was considered by the New York Yankees for their vacant hitting coach job and for a new role as assistant hitting coach prior to the 2015 season, but he ultimately was named hitting coach for the Yankees Triple-A affiliate the Scranton/Wilkes-Barre RailRiders.

New York Yankees
After the 2015 season, the Yankees dismissed Jeff Pentland as their hitting coach, promoted Alan Cockrell, their assistant hitting coach, to replace him, and promoted Thames to the role of assistant hitting coach. After the 2017 season, the Yankees dismissed Alan Cockrell as their hitting coach and promoted Thames to hitting coach. His contract was not renewed for the 2022 season.

Miami Marlins
On November 17, 2021, Thames was hired by the Miami Marlins to serve as the team's hitting coach for the 2022 season.

Personal life
Thames's mother, Veterine, has been paralyzed since an auto accident when Marcus was five years old. As a result, she has only been able to watch him play in person a handful of times.

Thames's nickname, "Slick", is the result of getting his hair cut too short when he was four years old.

Thames served in the Mississippi National Guard from 1994 to 1998. He has one daughter, Jade.

See also

 List of Major League Baseball players with a home run in their first major league at bat

References

External links

1977 births
Living people
African-American baseball coaches
African-American baseball players
Albuquerque Isotopes players
Baseball coaches from Mississippi
Baseball players from Mississippi
Columbus Clippers players
Detroit Tigers players
Greensboro Bats players
Gulf Coast Yankees players
Los Angeles Dodgers players
Major League Baseball hitting coaches
Major League Baseball left fielders
Minor league baseball coaches
Mississippi National Guard personnel
New York Yankees coaches
New York Yankees players
Norwich Navigators players
Oklahoma RedHawks players
People from Louisville, Mississippi
Scranton/Wilkes-Barre Yankees players
Tampa Yankees players
Texas Rangers players
Toledo Mud Hens players
21st-century African-American sportspeople
20th-century African-American sportspeople